Allocasuarina gymnanthera, commonly known as the mallee sheoak, is a species of Allocasuarina genera native to Australia.

It is found in low open woodland on sandy soils over sandstone ridges in eastern New South Wales

References

gymnanthera
Fagales of Australia
Flora of New South Wales
Dioecious plants